Maria Rosa is a surviving 1916 American silent drama film directed by Cecil B. DeMille. It was based on a 1914 Broadway stage play Maria Rosa by Àngel Guimerà. On the stage the principal parts were played by Dorothy Donnelly and Lou Tellegen, future husband of this film's star Geraldine Farrar.

Cast
 Geraldine Farrar as Maria Rosa
 Wallace Reid as Andreas
 Pedro de Cordoba as Ramon
 James Neill as The Priest
 Ernest Joy as Carlos
 Horace B. Carpenter as Pedro
 Anita King as Ana, Carlos' Wife

References

External links

1916 films
1916 drama films
Silent American drama films
Films based on works by Àngel Guimerà
Films directed by Cecil B. DeMille
American silent feature films
American black-and-white films
1910s American films